Edward Leslie Butler (25 February 1908 – 1985) was an English professional footballer who played in the Football League for Mansfield Town.

References

1908 births
1985 deaths
English footballers
Association football defenders
English Football League players
Derby County F.C. players
Southend United F.C. players
Mansfield Town F.C. players
Ollerton Colliery F.C. players